Chocolat is a 1988 French period drama film written and directed by Claire Denis in her directorial debut that follows a young girl who lives with her family in French Cameroon.  Marc and Aimée Dalens (François Cluzet and Giulia Boschi) play the parents of protagonist France (Cécile Ducasse), who befriends Protée (Isaach de Bankolé), a Cameroonian who is the family's household servant. The film was entered into the 1988 Cannes Film Festival.

Plot
An adult woman named France walks down a road toward Douala, Cameroon. She is picked up by William J. Park (Emmet Judson Williamson), an African American who has moved to Africa and is driving to Limbe with his son.  As they ride, France's mind drifts and we see her as a young girl in Mindif, French Cameroon in 1957, where her father was a colonial administrator.

The story is told through the eyes of young France, showing her friendship with the "houseboy," Protée, as well the sexual tension between him and her young and beautiful mother, Aimée.  The conflict of the film comes from the discomfort created as France and her mother attempt to move past the established boundaries between themselves and the native Africans.  This is brought to a head through Luc Segalen (Jean-Claude Adelin), a Western drifter who stays with the Dalens family after a small aircraft crashes nearby.  He acknowledges Aimée's attraction to Protée in the presence of other black servants.  This later results in a fight between Luc and Protée, which Protée wins. During the fight, Aimée sits nearby, unseen by the two. She attempts to seduce Protée after Luc has left but he rejects her advance.  Aimée consequently asks her husband to remove him from the house.  Protée is moved from his in-house job to working outdoors in the garage as a mechanic.

The title Chocolat ("chocolate") comes from the 1950s slang meaning "to be cheated," and thus refers to the status in French Cameroon of being black and being cheated; it is also an allusion to Protée's dark-brown skin and the racial fetishism of Africans by Europeans. Towards the end of the film, France's father reveals a central theme of the film as he explains to her what the horizon is. He tells her that it is a line that is there but not there, a symbol for the boundaries that exist in the country between rich and poor, master and servant, white and black, coloniser and colonised, male and female; a line that is always visible but impossible to approach or pass.

Cast
 Isaach de Bankolé as Protée
 Giulia Boschi as Aimée Dalens
 François Cluzet as Marc Dalens
 Cécile Ducasse as France Dalens, as a girl
 Mireille Perrier as France Dalens, as a woman
 Jean-Claude Adelin as Luc
 Laurent Arnal as Machinard
 Jean Bediebe as Prosper
 Didier Flamand as Captain Védrine
 Jean-Quentin Châtelain as Courbassol
 Emmanuelle Chaulet as Mireille Machinard
 Kenneth Cranham as Jonathan Boothby
 Jacques Denis as Joseph Delpich
 Clementine Essono as Marie-Jeanne
 Essindi Mindja as Blaise

Soundtrack
The soundtrack, performed and recorded by Abdullah Ibrahim, was released in 1988 as Mindif.

References

External links
 
 Film guide & resources for Culture & Literature of Africa course

1988 films
1980s adventure drama films
Cameroonian drama films
Films set in Cameroon
Films set in 1957
1980s French-language films
French drama films
Films directed by Claire Denis
Films set in the French colonial empire
1988 directorial debut films
1988 drama films
1980s French films